Claud Lovat Fraser (15 May 1890 London – 18 June 1921, Dymchurch) was an English artist, designer and author.

Early life
Claud Lovat Fraser was christened Lovat Claud; as a young man he reversed those names for euphony's sake but he was always known as Lovat. Fraser's father (also Claud) was a prominent solicitor, his mother an able amateur artist and musician. Fraser was educated at Windlesham House School and Charterhouse and after leaving school in 1907, aged 17, he commenced legal studies and he entered his father's firm as an Articled Clerk a year later, but he was always more interested in becoming an artist. In 1911 his father released him from his Articles, he left the firm and began to pursue a career in art.

After a year at the Westminster School of Art where his tutors included Walter Sickert he began to create a career for himself. He found an influential friend and supporter in the art critic Haldane MacFall and as an early commission executed illustrations for MacFall's essay on art and aesthetics entitled The Splendid Wayfaring. Through MacFall he also gained an introduction to the Actor Manager Sir Herbert Beerbohm Tree, proprietor of His Majesty’s Theatre in Haymarket. Tree in turn, at MacFall’s instigation, commissioned him to supply the illustrations for Thoughts and Afterthoughts, his volume of reminiscences and also gave him free run of his private suite in the theatre’s dome; Fraser began to get to know theatre people, and they him. However Tree subsequently declined, in January 1914, a proposed theatre piece The Three Students written by MacFall with designs by Fraser.

In 1913, along with Holbrook Jackson and the poet Ralph Hodgson, Lovat Fraser established a small publishing firm called The Sign of the Flying Fame to produce decorative poetry broadsides and chapbooks. Although printed in limited editions and often hand-coloured, they were affordably priced and were intended to make poetry more accessible to the general public.

World War One

In October 1914 Fraser enlisted with the Inns of Court Officers' Training Corps, and was quickly commissioned into the 14th Battalion of the Durham Light Infantry. After a year's training, in September 1915 the Battalion was sent out to France as part of 21st Division, one of three Reserve divisions for the forthcoming Battle of Loos. Fraser was fortunate to survive that battle unscathed; many of his battalion's officers were killed or wounded and a quarter of its men also became casualties. In December of that year, by now serving in the Ypres Salient, the battalion withstood a German gas attack in which Fraser may have suffered injuries to his lungs. He was promoted to captain in early 1916 but in mid-February that year he was invalided home, suffering from shellshock. During his period on active service he had produced many sketches, of the battlefields and of life behind the lines. Several of these sketches were submitted to the Imperial War Museum who purchased six of them in November 1917. Through continuing poor health he was never again sent abroad. He served as a clerk in the War Office on visual propaganda from October 1916 through to late April 1917, then at the Army Record Office in Hounslow until his discharge in March 1919.

In August 1916 Fraser met the American-born actress Grace Inez Crawford in her theatre dressing room. By Grace's description he was ‘tall, brown-haired and hazel-eyed, big-boned with a very fine white skin and a beautifully moulded Grecian mouth’. It was love at first sight and they were married in February 1917, and had a daughter, Helen. Grace's career interests contributed to Fraser's increased involvement in theatrical and costume design.

Later life
After the war Fraser made designs for the Harold Monro's Poetry Bookshop and for the Curwen Press. He also executed private commissions for bookplates, stationery and greeting cards. In 1919 he produced the designs for Nigel Playfair's ground-breaking production of As You Like It in Stratford upon Avon, then in 1920 for Playfair's highly successful London revival of John Gay's The Beggar's Opera.

During this period Grace and Lovat Fraser became friendly with Paul Nash. They were introduced by Nash and his wife to Dymchurch in Kent, where the two families holidayed together. On one such holiday there in 1921 Lovat was taken seriously ill. He died in a local nursing home on 18 June, after a surgical operation for obstruction of the bowel the previous day. He had a history of heart trouble following on an episode of rheumatic fever as a young man; by the time he left the Army this was already becoming severe. Neither his gassing in 1915, his smoking habit nor – latterly – his weight can have helped.

A memorial exhibition of his work was held in December 1921 at the Leicester Galleries in London. He is buried at St Bartholomew's Church in Buntingford, Hertfordshire, previously known as Layston Church.

His name is also inscribed on Buntingford War Memorial which he designed while living in the town.

References

 Ian Rogerson, Claud Lovat Fraser (4th ed. 1993)
 Grace Lovat Fraser, In the Days of My Youth (1970)
 Drinkwater, John and Albert Rutherston. Claud Lovat Fraser (1923)
 Macfall, Haldane. The Book of Lovat Fraser (1923. J.M. Dent, London)

External links

 The Claud Lovat Fraser and Grace Crawford Lovat Fraser Collections
 
 
 W.H. Crain Costume and Scene Design Collection at the Harry Ransom Center

1890 births
1921 deaths
Artists from London
British Army personnel of World War I
British illustrators
British war artists
Durham Light Infantry officers
English illustrators
People educated at Charterhouse School
World War I artists
People educated at Windlesham House School